The 2007 Hamilton Tiger-Cats season was the 50th season for the team in the Canadian Football League and their 58th overall. The Tiger-Cats finished in 4th place in the East Division with a 3–15 record and missed the playoffs.

Offseason

CFL Draft

Preseason

Regular season

Season standings

Season schedule

Player stats

Passing

Rushing

Receiving
Only players with over 100 receiving yards are shown.

Awards and records

2007 CFL All-Stars
 Nick Setta, K – CFL All-Star
 Zeke Moreno, LB – CFL All-Star

Eastern Division All-Star Selections
 Jesse Lumsden, RB – CFL Eastern All-Star
 Marwan Hage, C – CFL Eastern All-Star
 Nick Setta, K – CFL Eastern All-Star
 Zeke Moreno, LB – CFL Eastern All-Star

References

Hamilton Tiger-Cats seasons
Hamilton